Vito Zagarrio (born 2 May 1952) is an Italian film director, film critic and film historian.

He is a professor at the University of Florence and at Roma Tre University.

Filmography
Young Distance (1988)
Bonus malus (1993)
Three Days of Anarchy (2005)
Le seduzioni (2021)

References

External links
 

1952 births
Living people
Film people from Florence
Italian film directors
Italian film critics
Italian film historians